Arthrostylidium multispicatum, commonly known as woodland climbing bamboo, is a species of Arthrostylidium bamboo in the grass family.

Distribution 
Arthrostylidium multispicatum is native to Puerto Rico and the Caribbean.

References

multispicatum
Flora of Puerto Rico
Flora without expected TNC conservation status